Ruthenian Orthodox Church may refer to:

 an exonymic designation for Eastern Orthodox ecclesiastical jurisdictions among Eastern Slavs, during the late medieval and early modern periods, including: 
 the medieval and early modern Metropolis of Kiev and all Rus' (Eastern Orthodox) 
 the late medieval Metropolis of Halych (Eastern Orthodox) 
 the late medieval Metropolis of Lithuania (Eastern Orthodox) 
 Ruthenian Orthodox Church in Ukraine, an exonymic designation for early modern Eastern Orthodox Church, on the territory of Ukraine
 Belarusian Orthodox Church, an exonymic designation for the semi-automomous church of the Russian Orthodox Church, on the territory of Belarus

See also
 Ruthenian Catholic Church (disambiguation)